Bubble and Squeek is a British animated cartoon series created in 1946 by George Moreno Jr. It was released by British Animated Productions in Harringay, and was distributed by Pathe Pictures. The films revolve around the adventures of the two main characters: Bubble and Squeek. Their names are derived from the British dish bubble and squeak. All shorts were produced in Technicolor.

The series contained 4 films and 1 spin-off which were produced between 1946 and 1948. The cartoons have faded into obscurity and the only copies online are poor-quality copies from videotapes.

History 
George Moreno Jr. was an animator for Universal/Lantz and Fleischer Studios from 1938 to 1940, where he worked on Gulliver's Travels, among other series. During World War II he  befriended Richard Smith, showing him the concept of two characters, Bubble and Squeak. After the war Moreno Jr. and Smith developed British Animation Productions studio, and produced the characters and cartoons. Initially being planned as a full theatrical series, the company soon collapse after the United Kingdom lifted its restriction on foreign products, thus bringing in a flood of American-made cartoons to the market.

Plot
The cartoons revolve around the adventures of its two main characters. Bubble is a taxi driver. Squeek is the taxi whom Bubble drives. The cartoons visit a variety of places, from the funfair to a haunted house. Their adventures are light-hearted.

Characters

Bubble 
Bubble is a taxi driver who drives Squeek. He wears a green scarf, blue trousers, a yellow t-shirt, brown jacket and a hat.

Squeek 
Squeek is the taxi that is driven by Bubble. He has a blue body and yellow wheels.

Recurring characters 
Colonel Rat is featured in Old Manor House and also in Loch Ness Legend as he tries to get the Loch Ness Monster.

Willie the Worm is only featured in Loch Ness Legend. Willie helps Colonel catch the monster by using himself as bait.

Shorts

External links 
 Bubble and Squeek - Big City
 Bubble and Squeek - Fun Fair
 Bubble and Squeak - Old Manor House
 Bubble and Squeak - Home Sweet Home
 Bubble and Squeak - Loch Ness Legend

References 

1947 animated films
British animated films
1947 films
Animated film series
Film series introduced in 1947
Short film series
Male characters in animation
Fictional taxi drivers
Fictional cars
1940s British films